4 the people is an Indian Malayalam television series which aired on Asianet from 8 June 2015 to 4 March 2016. The show revolves around the life of 4 Teen Friends of the same college.

Plot 
The story revolves around the lives of four teen friends Vijay, Nandhu, Roy and Anuradha. They came together as a group by starting a Musical Band. Friendship with Anuradha comes with trouble in their life and this creates a series of upside-down scenarios for everyone related in their life. The story evolves with the four friends facing multiple issues in their college life and in their personal life.

[[
RWV]]

Cast 
 Aishwarya as Prof. Vasundhara Das
 Meera Nair P.S / Mithra. S. Nair (Ep 71-Final episode)as Anuradha
 Darshana Das as Priyanka
 Ambika Mohan as Rossamma
 Joemon Joshy as Nandhu
 Sreedev as Vijay Babu
 Arun .c. Kumar as Roy Thomas
 Deepa Jayan as Mithra
 David John as Sandeep
 TS Raju as John Peter
 Harisree yousuf as Manavalan
Vijayakumari  as Priyanka's mother

References 

Malayalam-language television shows
2015 Indian television series debuts
Asianet (TV channel) original programming
Indian teen drama television series
2016 Indian television series endings
Television series about teenagers